Kitten for a Day is a 1974 children's picture book by American author and illustrator Ezra Jack Keats, about a puppy that joins a litter of kittens for a day.

, the book was still in print.

Reception
Kirkus Reviews states "This is one of Keats' practically wordless picture books, and truth to tell there isn't much to the pictures either." and concludes "except on a cutesy level we thought Keats was above exploiting." while Publishers Weekly finds "Now, as ever, Keats's sunny illustrations reflect the joy of discovery."

References

1974 children's books
American picture books
Books by Ezra Jack Keats
Books about cats
Books about dogs